Stanze di vita quotidiana is an album from Italian singer-songwriter Francesco Guccini. It was released in 1974 by EMI Italiana. The title means "rooms of everyday life". Each piece in the album is titled with the prefix "Song of...". Some common themes in the album are solitude, memory of lost loved ones, sadness, and fear of death. They are often presented with a pessimistic and melancholic mood.

"Canzone delle osterie di fuori porta" is a favourite among Guccini's fans and it is often played during his concerts.

Track listing 

"Canzone delle osterie di fuori porta" (7:08)
"Canzone della triste rinuncia" (7:20)
"Canzone della vita quotidiana" (6:07) 
"Canzone per Piero" (6:22)
"Canzone delle ragazze che se ne vanno" (4:50)
"Canzone delle situazioni differenti" (9:03)

1974 albums
Francesco Guccini albums